Malaya is a rural locality (a village) in Tiginskoye Rural Settlement, Vozhegodsky District, Vologda Oblast, Russia. The population was 10 as of 2002.

Geography 
Malaya is located 21 km west of Vozhega (the district's administrative centre) by road. Shchegolikha is the nearest rural locality.

References 

Rural localities in Vozhegodsky District